Dalmosanus is a genus of ant-loving beetles in the family Staphylinidae. There are at least three described species in Dalmosanus.

Species
These three species belong to the genus Dalmosanus:
 Dalmosanus mollyae (Park, 1956)
 Dalmosanus quercavum (Chandler, 1990)
 Dalmosanus steevesi (Schuster & Grigarick, 1968)

References

Further reading

 
 

Pselaphinae
Articles created by Qbugbot